Shaw Historic District, also known as Francis B. Shaw Block Historic District, is a national historic district located in Doylestown, Bucks County, Pennsylvania.  The district includes seven contributing buildings in a residential and industrial area of Doylestown. The block was developed between 1833 and 1914, and includes the Bryan House (c. 1833), Clemens Double House (pre-1874), Goodman House (c. 1835), Kulp House (c. 1849), the Late Victorian-style Rhodes House (1891), Rhodes Livery Stable (1914), and the Doylestown Agricultural Works complex (1867, 1914). The Doylestown Agricultural Works was rebuilt after a fire in 1913; it closed in 1968.

It was added to the National Register of Historic Places in 1979.  In 1985, it was incorporated into the Doylestown Historic District.

References

External links
Doylestown Patch: Why Does the Doylestown Agricultural Works Include Former Houses?

Historic districts in Bucks County, Pennsylvania
Historic districts on the National Register of Historic Places in Pennsylvania
National Register of Historic Places in Bucks County, Pennsylvania